Villemaréchal is a commune in the Seine-et-Marne department in the Île-de-France region in north-central France. On 1 January 2019, the former commune Saint-Ange-le-Viel was merged into Villemaréchal.

Demographics
Inhabitants of Villemaréchal are called Villemarchais.

See also
Communes of the Seine-et-Marne department

References

External links

1999 Land Use, from IAURIF (Institute for Urban Planning and Development of the Paris-Île-de-France région) 

Communes of Seine-et-Marne

Communes nouvelles of Seine-et-Marne
Populated places established in 2019
2019 establishments in France